George "Duke" Robinson (born October 10, 1986) is a former American football guard. Robinson played college football for the University of Oklahoma, and was recognized as an All-American twice.  He was selected by the Carolina Panthers in the fifth round of the 2009 NFL Draft.

Early years
Robinson was born in Atlanta, Georgia.  He played high school football at Washington High School in Atlanta.

College career
Robinson attended the University of Oklahoma, where he played for coach Bob Stoops's Oklahoma Sooners football team from 2005 to 2008.  He was recognized as a consensus first-team All-American a junior in 2007, and again as a senior in 2008.  He was also a two-time first-team All-Big 12 selection.  Sports Illustrated magazine named him to its All-Decade Team in 2009.

Professional career

2009 NFL Draft
Robinson was considered the number one guard prospect by many NFL scouting analyst and projected to go 2nd round of the draft until a poor performance in the BCS championship game prior to the draft.
He was praised for his leadership, his ability to pass protect and be a force in the running game.

Carolina Panthers
Duke was selected in the fifth round of the 2009 draft with the 163rd overall pick by the Carolina Panthers.

Tennessee Titans
Duke Robinson was signed to the Titans on January 6, 2012. He was then released on April 20, 2012.

Utah Blaze
Duke signed with the Utah Blaze of the Arena Football League on May 6, 2013.

Spokane Shock
Robinson was assigned to the Spokane Shock after the AFL dispersal draft on September 6, 2013.

Philadelphia Soul
On May 28, 2014, Robinson was traded by the Shock to the Philadelphia Soul for Fred Shaw.

San Jose SaberCats
On June 2, 2014, Robinson was traded to the San Jose SaberCats for Julius Williams.

Jacksonville Sharks
On March 21, 2016, Robinson was assigned to the Jacksonville Sharks.

Portland Steel
On April 25, 2016, Robinson was traded to the Portland Steel for Jamar Howard.

Personal life
He is the grandnephew of singer/songwriter Smokey Robinson.

References

External links
Oklahoma Sooners bio

1986 births
Living people
All-American college football players
American football offensive guards
Carolina Panthers players
Oklahoma Sooners football players
Players of American football from Atlanta
Tennessee Titans players
Utah Blaze players
Spokane Shock players
Philadelphia Soul players
San Jose SaberCats players
Jacksonville Sharks players
Portland Steel players